Verbesina centroboyacana is a species of shrub in the family Asteraceae endemic to Colombia.

Description
Shrub that reaches 8 ft (2.5 m) in height. The leaves are alternate, coriaceous, ovate to ovate-lanceolate, glabrous on the upper surface and lower side; the apex is acute, the base is attenuated, forming a pseudopeciolus; Revolute margin, dentated only in upper two-thirds; pinnate venation. Inflorescences in corymbs or panicles, the pedicels are villous. Uniseriate bell-shaped involucre; the involucral bracts are linear-oblong, widened at the base and acute at the apex, glabrous or with sericeous indumentum towards the base. Convex receptacle; the paleas are oblong, folded, acute, glabrous, dark and with translucent spots, slightly ciliated on the margin. The flowers are white, with 5-10 female ray florets, ligulate, with a pubescent tube, the ligule is elliptical and tridentate, the style is bifid and glabrous, the ovary is triquetral, uniaristate and without a fin; with about 20 disk florets, hermaphroditic, with hairy tubulous corolla, slightly pentadentate, the teeth are oblong; anthers blackish with a mutic base. Obovate compressed achenes 4 mm in length, the external ones are thicker, hairy and with a poorly developed fin; the internal ones with scant indumentum, and a clear and ciliated fin; pappus formed by two ciliated edges.

Distribution
It is endemic to Colombia and is distributed along the Eastern Cordillera in the departments of Boyacá and Cundinamarca. It can be found between 1990 and 3120 meters above sea level.

References

centroboyacana
Endemic flora of Colombia
Plants described in 1985